Meriem Belmihoub-Zerdani (1 April 1935 – 27 July 2021) was an Algerian independence fighter, lawyer and feminist.

Life
As a student in the law faculty, in May 1956 Belmihoub became one of the first students to respond to the call of the National Liberation Front to serve as a nurse alongside the armed struggle for Algerian independence. Imprisoned in France for her activity providing medical care to Algerian soldiers, she and other women prisoners protested their incarceration in letters which were republished by the French humanitarian organization Secours populaire français, as well as in pamphlets of the Tunis-based Committee of Women Students of Algeria, Tunisia and Morocco.

Belmihoub became a deputy in the 1962–3 Constituent Assembly. She contributed to a series of articles published by the daily newspaper Le Peuple in August 1963, addressing the question 'Is there an Algerian women problem?':

In 1964 Belmihoub became one of the first two indigenous Algerian women to be called to the Bar of Algiers.

She has served as Vice-Chair of the Convention on the Elimination of All Forms of Discrimination Against Women (CEDAW). In 2012 she protested the exclusion of women veterans from the office of the National War Veterans' Organisation (ONM):

References

1935 births
2021 deaths
20th-century Algerian lawyers
Algerian women lawyers
Algerian feminists
Algerian independence activists
National Liberation Front (Algeria) politicians
21st-century Algerian lawyers
20th-century Algerian women politicians
20th-century Algerian politicians